The Bulgariaceae are a family of fungi in the order Helotiales. Species are found in northern and southern temperate regions. The family contains four genera and seven species.

References

Leotiomycetes